The La Quinta Resort & Club is a historic resort in present-day La Quinta, California. Designed by Gordon Kaufmann and built by Walter H. Morgan, the hotel opened in 1926 as a desert getaway.

The courses regularly play host to the Bob Hope Chrysler Classic charity golf tournament. La Quinta was expanded to its current size by Landmark Land Company in 1989.

Hollywood
A hangout for star celebrities since its inception, La Quinta Resort's greatest claim to fame is as the site which film director and frequent guest Frank Capra wrote the screenplay for Lost Horizon poolside in 1937.

Both La Quinta Resort & Club and PGA WEST were acquired by the Morgan Stanley Real Estate Fund, the real estate investment fund of Morgan Stanley, in 2007. In 2011, lenders including Paulson & Co.,  Winthrop Realty Trust and Capital Trust foreclosed on 8 of the former CNL hotels. in 2013, the owners reached a deal to sell the La Quinta and three other properties to the Government of Singapore Investment Corporation.  Hilton Hotels Corporation, based in McLean, Virginia, manages the hotel as a member of Waldorf Astoria Hotels and Resorts.

In July 2020, ABC reality dating show The Bachelorette began filming its sixteenth season in La Quinta, as all hotels were closed due to the COVID-19 pandemic in California.

References

External links

Palm Springs Life article on the history of La Quinta Resort

La Quinta, California
Hotels in California
Buildings and structures in Riverside County, California
La Quinta, Resort
Resorts in California
Golf clubs and courses in California
Golf clubs and courses designed by Pete Dye
Hilton Hotels & Resorts hotels
Hotels established in 1926
1926 establishments in California
Tourist attractions in Riverside County, California